The Canal Olímpic de Catalunya is a canal located in Castelldefels, Catalonia, Spain. Constructed in 1991, it hosted the canoe sprint events for the 1992 Summer Olympics.

References

1992 Summer Olympics official report. Volume 2. pp. 319–22.

Canals in Spain
Sports venues in Catalonia
Venues of the 1992 Summer Olympics
Olympic canoeing venues
Sports venues completed in 1991
1991 establishments in Spain